Tirunagar is a small locality within the Madurai district in the Indian state of Tamil Nadu.

Demographics 

As of the 2011 India census, Tirunagar had a population of 16,598, up from 15,549 from 2001. Males constitute 49.7% of the population and females 51.2%. Thirunagar has an average literacy rate of 87.4%, higher than the national average of 59.5%: male literacy is 89.1%, and female literacy is 85.7%. In Thirunagar, 8.4% of the population is under 6 years of age.

Sports 

Thirunagar has a 26-year-old cricket club known as Thirunagar Rainbow cricket club (formerly Thirunagar Emerald), which is the only cricket team from Thirunagar playing in the league of MDCA. The Thirunagar Hockey Club has won the state championships and several other senior tournaments.

Transport 

Thirunagar lies on the main road connecting Madurai and Thirumangalam.

References

Neighbourhoods and suburbs of Madurai